Krasnoye Zarechye is a rural locality (a selo) in Nebylovskoye Rural Settlement, Yuryev-Polsky District, Vladimir Oblast, Russia. The population was 324 as of 2010.

Geography 
Krasnoye Zarechye is located on the Koloksha River, 33 km southeast of Yuryev-Polsky (the district's administrative centre) by road. Prechistaya Gora is the nearest rural locality.

References 

Rural localities in Yuryev-Polsky District
Vladimirsky Uyezd